The ICAR Universal (I.C.A.R. Universal) was a 1930s Romanian two seat monoplane trainer, touring and aerobatics aircraft.

Design and development

The Universal was designed in 1932, led by engineer Mihail Racoviță, and manufactured in 1934 in the factory of ICAR (Īntreprinderea de construcţii aeronautice româneşti) in Bucharest. It was modeled after the German Messerschmitt M.23b, license — produced by the ICAR. There were three variants of the aircraft. The first was a long-distance single-seater sports aircraft, powered with 150 HP Siemens-Halske Sh 14 radial engine under NACA cowling, giving it a maximum speed of 180 km/h. One such aircraft (YR-MAI) was built for Princess Marina Stirbey. In a place of a forward cockpit, there was an additional fuel tank, giving it an endurance of 6 hours. In the late 1930s, it was converted to two-seater touring aircraft.

A further three aircraft were built in a single-seater aerobatics variant, ICAR Universal Acrobatic (YR-ACA, YR-ACB, YR-ACC). They had wing span increased to 12.9 m, and were powered by a Sh.14a radial engine under a NACA cowling.

Following the success of the single-seaters, a small series of 10 two-seat trainers was built, also known as ICAR Universal Biloc (="two-seater"). This variant was powered by a 150 HP de Havilland Gipsy Major inline engine, manufactured under licence at Braşov as the IAR 4GI. They were produced in 1935-1936.

Operational service
During August–September 1936, the long-range Universal (YR-MAI) was used by Marina Stirbey for a solo flight on the Bucharest-Tallinn-Helsinki-Copenhagen-Berlin-Bucharest route. Later, it was converted to two-seater.

From 1934, three Universal Acrobatics, painted red, were used in a famous Romanian prewar aerobatics team Dracii Roșii (Red Devils, pilots were Petre Ivanovici, Mihail Pantazi and Maximilian "Max" Manolescu). They performed at numerous air shows in 1934-1937. It remained the most successful aerobatics aircraft built in Romania for a long time.

Most examples of Universal Biloc were used for training. They received military serial numbers 1 to 10, painted in white, but later some were given civilian registrations. Between April 14 and May 25, 1935, military pilots Alexandru Cernescu, Mihail Pantazi, George Davidescu, Gheorghe Olteanu, Gheorghe Jienescu and Anton Stengher flew three modified Universal Bilocs (YR-ACL, YR-AEL, YR-AEY) in a flight from Bucharest to Cape Town and back (23,000 km) in 149 hours 10 minutes of flight time. Endurance of these modified aircraft was increased from 3 to 8.5 h.

Description
The Universal was a low-wing cantilever monoplane, with a fixed tail-skid landing gear trapezoidal, plywood skinned wings with rounded tips and fabric coveredailerons. The fuselage was a wooden framed, plywood covered semi-monocoque, with the forward fuselage covered with metal sheet. The standard aircraft had one or two open cockpits in tandem, each with an individual windscreen and the Universal Biloc had glass windows in the cockpit sides, to improve visibility below. Power was provided by a  IAR 4GI in-line engine in the Universal Biloc, or  Siemens-Halske Sh 14 radial engine, with NACA cowling, driving a two-blade fixed-pitch propeller. In the aerobatics variant, the main landing gear had teardrop spats.

Variants
Universal standard utility / sport / trainer aircraft.
Universal Acrobatic aerobatic competition  and training aircraft.
Universal Biloc Trainer also used in long distance record-breaking flights.

Operators

Specifications

See also

Notes

Further reading

External links

Photos and drawings at Ugolok Neba site
Airclub of Romania

1930s Romanian sport aircraft
Single-engined tractor aircraft
Low-wing aircraft
Aircraft first flown in 1934